This is a list of the French Singles & Airplay Chart Reviews number-ones of 1967.

Summary

Singles Chart

See also
1967 in music
List of number-one hits (France)

References

1967 in France
1967 record charts
Lists of number-one songs in France